Luperosaurus palawanensis, also  known as Palawan wolf gecko or Palawan flapped-legged gecko, is a species of gecko. It is endemic to  Palawan in the Philippines.

References

Luperosaurus
Reptiles described in 1978
Reptiles of the Philippines
Endemic fauna of the Philippines
Fauna of Palawan